WOFL (channel 35) is a television station in Orlando, Florida, United States, serving as the market's Fox network outlet. It is owned and operated by the network's Fox Television Stations division alongside MyNetworkTV station WRBW (channel 65). Both stations share studios on Skyline Drive in Lake Mary, while WOFL's transmitter is located in unincorporated Bithlo, Florida.

WOGX (channel 51) in Ocala operates as a semi-satellite of WOFL, serving the Gainesville television market. As such, it clears all network programming as provided through its parent and simulcasts most of WOFL's newscasts, but airs a separate offering of syndicated programming; there are also separate local commercial inserts and legal station identifications. Although WOGX maintains an advertising sales office on Northwest 53rd Avenue in Gainesville, master control and most internal operations are based at WOFL's studios.

History

As WSWB (1974–1978)
Channel 35 in Orlando first began broadcasting March 31, 1974, as WSWB, Central Florida's first independent station. Owned by Sun World Broadcasting, WSWB produced children's programming (Uncle Hubie's Penthouse Barnyard), and aired reruns of such shows as Batman, Bugs Bunny, Popeye, Green Acres, Mister Ed and Lost in Space. Its sign-on was 19 months late, delayed by shortages affecting the construction of its studios and excavation necessary to erect its tower at Bithlo, which briefly was the tallest structure in Florida.

The 1970s recession impacted the station's operations, and Sun World encountered financial difficulties. Within months, Sun World was searching for a buyer. In June 1975, they appeared to have found it when they entered into an agreement with Martin International Corp. The deal was filed with the Federal Communications Commission (FCC) that December, but Sun World's troubles continued to worsen. In January 1976, the studio building, tower and land were auctioned as part of foreclosure proceedings.

A running dispute with RCA over payment for leased equipment ended with the company obtaining a court order to seize the assets on September 29, 1976. The following afternoon, U.S. Marshals entered the station and shut it down at 2:39 p.m., in the middle of an airing of The Mickey Mouse Club, beginning to remove RCA's property. Negotiations began to try to restore operations, with a myriad of involved parties, including RCA: creditor Continental Credit Corporation, which had earlier obtained an order to seize office equipment to meet its debt; Sun World; and Ted Turner, owner of the Atlanta Braves and television stations in Atlanta and Charlotte, who had paid $250,000 for the  transmitter site.

Turner sought the appointment of a receiver to manage WSWB's affairs. Judge Frederick Pfeiffer agreed and named Edwin Starr as receiver in November. However, Pfeiffer then in April 1977 turned down Starr's recommendation to sell the license to Turner and opted for the bid backed by shareholders, of a five-investor consortium known as the Omega group. An attempt by Turner to overturn the ruling was rebuffed. In the meantime, the former WSWB studios were sold to public television station WMFE-TV (channel 24).

RCA's $2 million judgment and equipment was acquired by another new party to the proceeding: the Christian Broadcasting Network. CBN would play a further role in delaying the return to air of channel 35 after the Omega license transfer was filed at the FCC in September 1978. Omega prevailed at the FCC and in Florida courts over objections by Turner and CBN.

As WOFL (1979–present)
Omega immediately set out to return the station to air. It bought the former Orange State Bank building on South Orange Blossom Trail, renovating it into new studios. Under the new call sign WOFL, channel 35 returned to the air on October 15, 1979.

Meredith Corporation, which had been a stakeholder in Omega, exercised its option to buy out Omega in 1982. In 1986, the station moved to its current facility in Lake Mary—a major change from the Orange Blossom Trail site. As the 1980s progressed, WOFL acquired more recent sitcoms, cartoons and movies.

WOFL became one of the Fox Broadcasting Company's charter affiliates at the network's inception on October 9, 1986. However, it still essentially programmed itself as an independent in the network's first few years because, until April 1987, Fox carried only one program (The Late Show Starring Joan Rivers). The station was frequently ranked as one of the country's leading Fox affiliates during the network's early years, achieving a number one ranking on several occasions through the early 1990s. It was also the most profitable station in Meredith's station group, despite being its only UHF "independent" station at that time. As the 1990s progressed, WOFL offered fewer movies and older shows, and more talk, reality and court shows. As with most Fox stations, WOFL carried children's programming including those from the network's Fox Kids block. Despite having competing independents, WOFL was one of the last remaining Fox affiliates in a major market to retain broadcasting rights to most cartoons syndicated by Disney throughout the 1990s; while this left Orlando without an official Disney Afternoon lineup (due to Fox Kids competing for those same timeframes in most markets), the station still aired all of the lineup, though out of pattern in other timeslots.

Most of WOFL's programming, including Fox programming, was originally seen in Citrus County on W49AI in the 1980s. The station did not air WOFL's late-night programming, however, as it signed off at midnight. This arrangement continued until Ocala-based WOGX (channel 51) became the Fox affiliate for Gainesville in 1991. In 1996, WOFL took over the operations of WOGX, which became a semi-satellite of WOFL.

WOFL, along with KVVU (channel 5) in Las Vegas, were excluded from the 1994 affiliation deal between Meredith and CBS, which was spurred by an affiliation deal between Fox and New World Communications that caused Tampa-based WTVT (channel 13) and 11 other stations to switch to the network. The two stations were among Fox's strongest affiliates at the time, despite WOFL broadcasting on the UHF band and WTVT broadcasting on the VHF band. At the same time, CBS's existing Orlando station, WCPX-TV (channel 6, now WKMG-TV), was one of that network's weaker affiliates, and Fox did not want to move from a UHF outlet to a lower-rated VHF outlet. Meredith briefly owned WCPX for one day in September 1997, following a merger with that station's owner, First Media.

In 2002, Meredith traded WOFL and WOGX to News Corporation's Fox Television Stations Group, and, in return, Meredith received KPTV (channel 12) in Portland, Oregon; the deal was finalized on June 17, 2002, making WOFL a Fox owned-and-operated station, and sister station to then-UPN affiliate WRBW. Fox had acquired WRBW and KPTV several months earlier, when it acquired the United Television station group. This trade protected WOFL's Fox affiliation. After the trade was finalized, WRBW merged its operations with those of WOFL, and moved into WOFL's facility in Lake Mary. WOFL was the only network-owned station in the Orlando/Daytona Beach market during that time as the Chris-Craft purchase effectively stripped WRBW of its status as a UPN O&O. WOFL began airing fewer cartoons on the weekdays in the late 1990s and, in 2002, dropped them altogether during the five-day week when Fox ended its children's programming block and leased the lineup to 4Kids Entertainment under the 4Kids TV brand. Until Fox bought WJZY in Charlotte in 2013 (currently owned by Nexstar Media Group), it was also the smallest Fox O&O in the Eastern Time Zone.

On December 14, 2017, The Walt Disney Company, owner of ABC (affiliated network of WFTV, channel 9), announced its intent to buy WOFL's parent company, 21st Century Fox, for $66.1 billion; the sale, which closed on March 20, 2019, excluded WOFL and sister stations WRBW and WOGX as well as the Fox network, the MyNetworkTV programming service, Fox News, Fox Sports 1 and the Fox Television Stations unit, which were all transferred to the newly-formed Fox Corporation (since an outright buyout of Fox would be illegal under FCC regulations prohibiting a merger between any two of the four major networks).

News operation

WOFL presently broadcasts 57½ hours of locally produced newscasts each week (with 9½ hours each weekday and five hours each on Saturdays and Sundays); in regards to the number of hours devoted to news programming, it is the highest local newscast output of any television station in the Orlando market. As is commonplace with Fox stations that carry early evening weekend newscasts, WOFL's Saturday and Sunday 5 p.m. newscasts are subject to preemption due to sports coverage. WOFL's Ocala semi-satellite, WOGX (channel 51), currently simulcasts all of WOFL's newscasts, with the weeknight 11 p.m. show becoming the last newscast to be included in September 2022. WOFL shares resources with Tampa sister station WTVT in areas of Florida in which the Orlando and Tampa markets overlap; the stations share reporters for stories occurring in Florida counties served by both markets, and WOFL also simulcasts WTVT's Tampa Bay Buccaneers pregame show Scott Smith's Tailgate Sunday.

For several years from 1988 to 1998, WOFL's news programming consisted solely of daily news updates featured during the station's syndicated programming. Meredith Corporation eventually decided to establish a full-fledged news department for WOFL, as Fox encouraged its affiliates to offer news programming; the station premiered a half-hour 10 p.m. newscast in March 1998, and became the first independently produced newscast in the Orlando market outside the "big three" major-network affiliates. WOFL was noted for initially providing "hip" white Ford Mustangs for its news crews. The primetime newscast expanded to an hour in the fall of 1999. In September 2000, the station launched a two-hour weekday morning newscast called Good Day Orlando; this program later expanded to three hours from 6 to 9 a.m. in September 2002, with the Good Day Orlando being dropped for the existing 7–9 a.m. block of the broadcast in favor of the Fox 35 Morning News brand.

WOFL began competing against the Big Three affiliates in the early evening timeslot with the debut of the 5 p.m. newscast in March 2006, which expanded to seven days a week that fall. A 6 p.m. newscast was added in August 2007 and an 11 p.m. newscast began in January 2008; unlike many other Fox owned-and-operated stations that began airing newscasts in the traditional late news timeslot following Fox's purchase of the New World Communications station group, the 11 p.m. newscast does not use the NewsEdge title.

On February 9, 2009, WOFL became the third station in the Central Florida area to broadcast news in high definition. In June 2009, WOFL shut down its sports department, making it the only Fox-owned station without full-time sports segments; sports anchors Kevin Holden and Tom Johnson were reassigned to other positions. On October 27, 2009, WOFL debuted a new Doppler weather radar called "The Guardian", the most powerful radar system in the market operating on 1 million watts.

On September 14, 2009, the station rescheduled Fox 35 Morning News to 5–8:30 a.m. and launched an extension of the newscast called Good Day (marking a return of the brand after seven years), running weekdays from 8:30 to 10 a.m. The 8:30 half-hour was shortly reabsorbed into the morning news; however, on November 8, 2010, the entire morning newscast took on the Good Day name, along with an updated version of their news theme music. Also, in April 2010, the morning news was expanded to 4:30 a.m., expanding the entire morning newscast to 5½ hours each weekday morning and competing against an earlier-launched 4:30 a.m. newscast on NBC affiliate WESH (channel 2). In November 2012, the morning show was renamed Good Day Orlando to match other Fox affiliates around the country.

On April 25, 2016, Good Day Orlando was further expanded to 4 a.m., making the entire morning newscast 6 hours each weekday morning.

Technical information

Subchannels
The station's digital signal is multiplexed:

Analog-to-digital conversion
WOFL was the first television station in the Orlando market to commence broadcasting of its digital signal in February 2000 on UHF channel 22. The station's digital signal began broadcasting in widescreen format in January 2002, and started to offer high definition programming in the 720p resolution format in September 2004.

WOFL shut down its analog signal, on UHF channel 35, on June 12, 2009, as part of the federally mandated transition from analog to digital television. The station's digital signal continued to broadcast on its pre-transition UHF channel 22. Through the use of PSIP, digital television receivers display the station's virtual channel as its former UHF analog channel 35.

WOFL was one of three stations in the Orlando area (along with WKCF and WKMG-TV) to participate in the "Analog Nightlight" program, which lasted until WOFL's analog transmitter was shut down permanently on July 12, 2009.

References

External links

Fox network affiliates
Buzzr affiliates
Fox Television Stations
Television channels and stations established in 1974
OFL
1974 establishments in Florida